Fahad Al-Rashidi (born 16 May 1997) is a Saudi Arabian professional footballer who plays as a winger for Saudi Pro League side Al-Taawoun.

Club career
Al-Rashidi started his career at the youth team of Al-Selmiyah before joining the youth team of Al-Hilal on 2 July 2015. He was promoted to the first team during the 2017–18 season and made his first-team debut 27 July 2017 against Iraqi side Naft Al-Wasat in the 2017 Arab Club Championship group stage match. On 30 January 2018, Al-Rashidi made his league debut for Al-Hilal against Al-Raed. On 19 January 2019, Al-Rashidi joined Ohod on a six-month loan. On 17 August 2019, Al-Rashidi joined Al-Taawoun on a free transfer.

Career statistics

Club

Honours
Al-Hilal
Pro League: 2017–18

References

External links
 

1997 births
Living people
People from Riyadh Province
Saudi Arabian footballers
Saudi Arabia youth international footballers
Association football wingers
Saudi Professional League players
Al Hilal SFC players
Ohod Club players
Al-Taawoun FC players